Utsugi may refer to:

Mount Utsugi, a mountain of Nagano Prefecture, Japan
Utsugi (Inuyasha), a character in the video game Inuyasha: The Secret of the Cursed Mask

People with the surname
, Japanese softball player
, Japanese women's footballer

Japanese-language surnames